Robert Gilchrist may refer to:
Robert Gilchrist (basketball) (born 1990), professional basketball player
Robert Gilchrist (mayor) (died 1866), mayor of Jersey City, New Jersey
Robert Gilchrist (cricketer) (1821–1905), Scottish cricketer
Robert Gilchrist Jr. (1825–1888), Attorney General of New Jersey
Robert Budd Gilchrist (1796–1856), U.S. federal judge
Robert Gilchrist (poet) (1797–1844), Tyneside poet
Robert Murray Gilchrist (1868–1917), English novelist and author
Robert S. Gilchrist (born 1964), American diplomat